Jan Maas (born 19 February 1996) is a Dutch professional racing cyclist, who currently rides for UCI WorldTeam . In 2022 Maas was selected for the Dutch national team at the road race European and World Championships.

Major results

2014
 2nd Ronde van Vlaanderen Juniores
 6th Overall Aubel–Thimister–La Gleize
1st Stage 2a (TTT)
2015
 6th Piccolo Giro di Lombardia
 10th Flèche Ardennaise
2016
 8th Trofej Umag
2017
 7th Flèche Ardennaise
 9th Overall Ronde de l'Isard
 10th Paris–Tours Espoirs
 10th Gooikse Pijl
2018
 9th Ronde van Midden-Nederland
2019
 6th Overall Giro della Regione Friuli Venezia Giulia
2020
 1st Trofeo Ciutat de Manacor
 6th Tour du Doubs
2021
 3rd Overall Tour de la Mirabelle
 4th Overall Istrian Spring Trophy
 5th Overall Oberösterreich Rundfahrt
 10th Overall Sazka Tour

References

External links

1996 births
Living people
Dutch male cyclists
Sportspeople from Bergen op Zoom
Cyclists from North Brabant